James Brasfield (born January 19, 1952 in Savannah, Georgia) is an American poet and translator.

Life
He graduated from Armstrong State College, and Columbia University, with an MFA.

His work has appeared in AGNI, Chicago Review, Colorado Review, Crazyhorse, The Iowa Review, New Orleans Review, Poetry Wales, The Seattle Review, and The Southern Review.

He was a Fulbright Scholar at the National University of Kyiv-Mohyla Academy, Ukraine from 1993 through 1994; he later returned to the Ukraine to teach at Yuri Fedkovych State University in 1999. He taught at Western Carolina University and was visiting assistant professor in the University of Memphis in 2008 through 2009. Brasfield currently teaches in the English Department at Pennsylvania State University.

Awards
 2001 NEA Fellowship in Poetry
 2000 PEN Award for Poetry in Translation
 The Pennsylvania Council on the Arts Fellowship

Works
 "Celan", AGNI, 2002
 "Palladium" (2016), Originally published in Poem-a-Day on August 10, 2016, by the Academy of American Poets. 
 This poem was set to song, titled "Palladium", with permission from Brasfield by composer Edward Jacobs in 2017.
  (Chapbook)

Translations
 "Swan", Oleh Lysheha, AGNI, 2002

Anthologies

References

1952 births
Living people
Poets from Georgia (U.S. state)
Armstrong State College alumni
Columbia University School of the Arts alumni
Western Carolina University faculty
University of Memphis faculty
Academic staff of the National University of Kyiv-Mohyla Academy
Pennsylvania State University faculty
American expatriate academics
American expatriates in Ukraine
Academic staff of Chernivtsi University